Tomáš Hunal (born 1 June 1973) is a former Czech football player.

Hunal started his football career at Slavia Prague. He played for several top flight Czech clubs, including Viktoria Žižkov and FK Teplice. He faced allegations of bribery while at Viktoria Žižkov in 2002, which led to him finding a new club. In 2007, he moved to SK Dynamo České Budějovice, where he spent three seasons. In 2010 Hunal ended his professional career.

References

External links
 Profile at iDNES.cz

Czech footballers
1973 births
Living people
Czech First League players
SK Slavia Prague players
SK Kladno players
FK Mladá Boleslav players
FK Viktoria Žižkov players
FK Teplice players
SK Dynamo České Budějovice players
Association football defenders
1. FK Příbram players
Footballers from Prague